Diaphoreolis is a genus of sea slugs, aeolid nudibranchs, marine gastropod molluscs in the family Trinchesiidae.

Diaphoreolis species feed on hydroids.

Species 
Species in the genus Diaphoreolis included:
 Diaphoreolis flavovulta (MacFarland, 1966)
 Diaphoreolis lagunae (O'Donoghue, 1926)
 Diaphoreolis viridis (Forbes, 1840) - type species (as Eolis northumbrica Alder & Hancock, 1844)

References

Trinchesiidae